Michael Russell was the defending champion but chose not to defend his title.

Flavio Cipolla won the title after defeating Stéphane Bohli 6–4, 7–5 in the final.

Seeds

Draw

Finals

Top half

Bottom half

References
Main Draw
Qualifying Draw

Internationaux de Nouvelle-Caledonie - Singles
2008 Singles